The Brežice Water Tower was built in 1914, together with a city sewage system and electrification. It used to serve as the water supply for Brežice until the new water house was built below Šentvid Hill above the town. Today the water tower houses a pub.

See also 
Water Tower

References

External links 

Towers completed in 1914
water tower
Water towers in Slovenia
20th-century architecture in Slovenia